Waymond Lane "Hut" Stricklin Jr. (born June 24, 1961) is an American former professional stock car racing driver.

Racing career
Stricklin grew up in Calera, Alabama. He married Pam Allison, the daughter of NASCAR legend Donnie Allison after they were introduced by her cousin Davey. Stricklin was the last member of the Alabama Gang.

In 1987, Stricklin won NASCAR's Dash Series championship and made his debut in what was then the Winston Cup Series.

Two years later, he finished second to Dick Trickle in the NASCAR Rookie of the Year competition with car owner Rod Osterlund. In his sophomore season, he competed in only three events before taking over the driving chores of Bobby Allison's No. 12 Raybestos Brakes-sponsored Buick. 1991 turned out to be one of his best seasons, as he finished 16th in points as well as a career high second-place finish at Michigan International Speedway. With eight races left in the 1992 season, Stricklin was fired by Allison.  Stricklin ended the season driving for Junie Donlavey.  For 1993, Stricklin signed with Junior Johnson, driving the No. 27 McDonald's-sponsored Ford. In 1994, Stricklin paired with owner Travis Carter to form a new team, the No. 23 Camel Cigarettes-sponsored Ford. It was a disappointing year for Stricklin, finishing 26th in points.

After Stricklin failed to find a ride for 1995, he served as a consultant for Kenny Bernstein's rookie driver Steve Kinser, a World of Outlaws Sprint Car champion who was struggling to transition from dirt to pavement. During the season, Kinser resigned, and Stricklin took over, posting five Top 10 finishes. However the team closed at the end of the year.

Stricklin joined the Stavola Brothers Racing No. 8 Circuit City-sponsored Ford in 1996. He had a second-place finish at Darlington Raceway, and ended up 22nd in the points standings that year.

In 1998, Stricklin started the season with the Stavola Brothers, but was released after failing to make the Coca-Cola 600.  Stricklin ended the season as a substitute for David Green and Robert Pressley.

1999 presented Stricklin with a new challenge. He was now the crew chief for Gary Bradberry's No. 78 Ford for Triad Motorsports. When that team was sold, Stricklin took over the No. 58 Ford for SBIII Motorsports. He posted some of the best finishes of the year for that team, including a top-ten finish at Michigan. Despite posting three consecutive DNQs, Stricklin appeared to have found solid footing, as Barbour announced that he would be his driver through 2003, and would have Motorsports Safety Technologies as his sponsor. However, sponsorship again plagued Stricklin, as shortly after signing the deal, MST produced a bounced check, causing Barbour's team to close its doors for good.

In 2000, Stricklin drove for Donlavey at the Brickyard 400 and finished 14th. In 2001, Strickin had a sixth-place finish at Michigan. However, Sara Lee, parent company of sponsor Hills Brothers demanded Donlavey pull their decals after he released Stricklin from the team.  In 2002, Stricklin moved to Bill Davis Racing, bringing Hills Bros. with him. However, Stricklin was replaced with Kenny Wallace prior to the Southern 500.

Motorsports career results

NASCAR
(key) (Bold – Pole position awarded by qualifying time. Italics – Pole position earned by points standings or practice time. * – Most laps led.)

NASCAR Cup Series

Daytona 500

Busch Series

References

External links
 
 
 Stricklin out of Winston Cup Ride

Living people
1961 births
People from Calera, Alabama
Racing drivers from Alabama
NASCAR drivers
ISCARS Dash Touring Series drivers
American Speed Association drivers
Alabama Gang
Hendrick Motorsports drivers